The 2015–16 season was the season of competitive football (soccer) in Senegal.

Diary of the season
8 November: the 2015-16 Ligue 1 season begins
22 November:
Gorée took the number one position
Niarry Tally lost to Diambars 0–3 which makes up the highest scored matches away, one of five
4th round: ASEC Ndiambour took the number one position
5th round: Mbour-Petite Côte took the number one position
AS Douanes competed in the 2016 CAF Champions League
6th round: ASEC Ndiambour retook the number one position
12th round: Mbour-Petite Côte retook the number one position
13th round: AS Douanes took the number one position
28 March: ASEC Ndiambour lost to La Linguère 0-3 which makes up the biggest matches scored matches away, one of five
10 April: Casa Sport defeated Douanes 4–0 which makes up the highest scored matches at home, one of two
24 April: Casa Sport lost to La Linguère 1-4 which makes up the highest scored matches away, one of three
7 May: Olympique Ngor lost to Diambars 1-4 which makes up the highest scored matches away, one of three
18th round: Casa Sport took the number one position
22nd round: Djambars took the number one position
12 June: 
Jaraaf defeated Douanes 4-0 which makes up the highest scored matches at home, one of two
Gorée once again took the number one position for the rest of the season
19 June:
Olympique de Ngor lost to Gorée 0-3 which makes up the biggest matches scored away, one of five
US Gorée won their fourth and recent title for the club and qualifies into the 2017 CAF Champions League the following season.
Niarry Tally won their  cup title for Senegal
Djambars won their only league cup title for Senegal

Ligue 1

US Gorée won their fourth and recent title for the club after winning with 42 points. ASC Linguère scored the most goals numbering 32.

Ligue 2
From each group, Génération Foot (Group A) and Teungueth FC (Group B) were Ligue 2 champions of 2015-16.

See also
2015 in Senegal
2016 in Senegal
Timeline of Senegalese football

References

 
2015 in association football
2016 in association football